Katie McGrath is an Irish actress. In television, she gained recognition for portraying Morgana Pendragon in the BBC One series Merlin (2008–2012), Lucy Westenra on the British-American series Dracula (2013–2014), Saskia in the TV series Secret Bridesmaids Business, and Sarah Bennett in the first season of the horror anthology series Slasher (2016), and for her role as Lena Luthor on the superhero series Supergirl (2016–2021). Her film roles include Lady Thelma Furness in the drama film W.E. and Jules Daly in the Christmas movie  A Princess for Christmas (2011), Zara Young in the science fiction adventure film Jurassic World (2015), and Elsa in the epic fantasy film King Arthur: Legend of the Sword (2017).

Early life
McGrath was raised in Ashford, County Wicklow, by her father, Paul, who works with computers, and mother, Mary, who works for an Irish designer. She has two older brothers, Sean, an online media manager, and Rory, who is a post-production producer. She studied the International Baccalaureate at St. Andrew's College before graduating from Trinity College, Dublin, with a degree in history with a focus on Russian history.

At a young age she applied to the Ballygowan 'Be the Face of MTV' competition. Twenty finalists would be able to attend MTV Lick Party at the Tivoli.

Career
McGrath originally sought to work in fashion journalism and took on a job at Image magazine before becoming a wardrobe assistant on the set of The Tudors. While working on The Tudors, McGrath was advised to try acting, so she sent photographs to Irish agents. She said:

McGrath was cast in Damage, an Irish TV-movie in 2007. She also starred in the play La Marea at the Dublin Theatre Festival in the same year. She appeared in the feature films Eden and Freakdog in 2008, before being cast as Morgana Pendragon in Merlin.

In 2009, McGrath starred in a five-part docudrama for Channel 4 exploring the life of Queen Elizabeth II, The Queen, in which she played a young Princess Margaret. Emilia Fox portrayed Elizabeth II in the same episode in which McGrath appeared; the two had previously worked together as sisters Morgause and Morgana in Merlin. In 2010, McGrath was cast in Madonna's directorial debut W.E., an Edward VIII biopic. McGrath played Lady Furness, the king's former mistress who introduces him to Wallis Simpson.

In 2011, McGrath appeared with  Roger Moore in the comedy-drama film A Princess for Christmas, a Hallmark Channel Original Movie shot mainly at the picturesque Peleş Castle in Romania. In September 2011, McGrath voice-acted the characters in the Irish animated short film Tríd an Stoirm (Through the Storm). Later that month, McGrath was cast as Oriane Congost in Labyrinth.

McGrath was reunited with her The Tudors co-star and close friend Jonathan Rhys Meyers in NBC and Sky Living's horror drama TV series Dracula; she portrayed Lucy Westenra. In June 2013, McGrath co-starred in episode four of the Channel 4 show Dates as a young lesbian on the dating scene alongside Gemma Chan.

In November 2014, McGrath co-starred in a Hozier music video for the song "From Eden".

In 2015, McGrath had a supporting role as Zara in the film Jurassic World and starred in the Crackle original spy-thriller, The Throwaways.

McGrath portrayed the lead role in the first season of Chiller's original horror series Slasher, which premiered on 4 March 2016.

In 2016, it was announced that McGrath would play the recurring role of Lena Luthor in the second season of Supergirl. She debuted in the season two premiere episode titled "The Adventures of Supergirl" and was promoted to a series regular in March 2017 and maintained this role until the show's end in 2021. She appeared as Elsa in Guy Ritchie's fantasy film King Arthur: Legend of the Sword, which was released in May 2017.

In 2019, McGrath starred alongside Abbie Cornish and Georgina Haig in Seven Network series Secret Bridesmaids' Business, about how a bride's wedding turns deadly after one of the bridesmaids invites a stranger into their lives. McGrath starred as Saskia, a bisexual lawyer who is described as an intelligent, loyal woman who is holding a secret.

In 2020, McGrath voice narrated the book Islands of Mercy by Rose Tremain.

Filmography

Awards and nominations

References

External links

 

Date of birth missing (living people)
Year of birth missing (living people)
Living people
21st-century Irish actresses
Actresses from County Wicklow
Alumni of Trinity College Dublin
Irish film actresses
Irish television actresses
People educated at St Andrew's College, Dublin